Dominique Jean-Zéphirin (born 3 June 1982) is a Haitian-French former footballer who played as a goalkeeper. His last known club was Étoile Fréjus Saint-Raphaël.

Between 2008 and 2014, he won 16 caps for the Haiti national football team.

Personal life

He is Liz Milian's husband and they have a  baby boy recently January 19, 2017 his name is Layvin. Liz Milian is the sister of singer Christina Milian and features in season 2 of the TV show Christina Milian Turned Up.

References

External links

1982 births
Living people
Haitian footballers
French footballers
Association football goalkeepers
Lewes F.C. players
Slough Town F.C. players
Aylesbury United F.C. players
Dover Athletic F.C. players
Staines Town F.C. players
Farnborough F.C. players
AFC Wimbledon players
Isthmian League players
Southern Football League players
OGC Nice players
Footballers from Nice
French sportspeople of Haitian descent
Haitian expatriate footballers
French expatriate footballers
Haitian expatriate sportspeople in England
French expatriate sportspeople in England
Expatriate footballers in England
2009 CONCACAF Gold Cup players
Rapid de Menton players
2014 Caribbean Cup players
Haiti international footballers